The W class is a series of 20 container ships operated by Yang Ming Marine Transport Corporation. The maximum theoretical capacity  of the ships is between 14,078 and 14,200 TEU.

History 
The order for the first 15 ships was announced in 2013. The ships would be chartered from Seaspan Corporation for a length of 10 years. Ten of the ships would be built by Hyundai Heavy Industries and the remaining five would be built by CSBC Corporation, Taiwan. The first ship was delivered in 2015.

In 2015 Yang Ming ordered another 5 container ships. This time the ships would be built by Imabari Shipbuilding and they would be chartered from Shoei Kisen Kaisha.

List of ships

References 

Container ship classes
Ships built by Hyundai Heavy Industries Group